Mirae (In Korean, Future) may refer to :

Daegu Mirae College, a private college located in Gyeongsan City, South Korea
Mirae Asset, a securities and insurance company, headquartered in Seoul, South Korea
Mirae caritatis, an encyclical of Pope Leo XIII on the Holy Eucharist given on 28 May 1902
The Daewoo Mirae, a car unveiled on April 20, 1999 by Queen Elizabeth II
Mirae (band), a South Korean boy group signed to DSP Media